"Sa Aking Mga Kabatà" is a poem about the love of one's native language written in Tagalog. It is widely attributed to the Filipino national hero José Rizal, who supposedly wrote it in 1868 at the age of eight. There is no evidence, however, to support authorship by Rizal and several historians now believe it to be a hoax. The actual author of the poem is suspected to have been the poets Gabriel Beato Francisco or Hermenegildo Cruz.

Prominence
[[File:Sa Aking Mga Kabata (in Herminigildo Cruz, Kun Sino ang Kumatha ng Florante, 1906).jpg|thumb|The oldest known copy of the poem appears in Kun sino ang kumathâ ng̃ "Florante": kasaysayan sa buhay ni Francisco Baltazar at pag-uulat nang kanyang karunung̃a't kadakilaan (1906) by Hermenegildo Cruz. Note that the poem uses the Philippine Commonwealth-era Tagalog spelling with a 'K'. If Rizal had indeed written it, it should have used the phonetically equivalent Spanish 'C'.]]
The poem was widely taught in Philippine schools to point out Rizal's precociousness and early development of his nationalistic ideals.

A passage of the poem often paraphrased as "Ang hindi marunong magmahal sa sariling wika, masahol pa sa hayop at malansang isda" (English: "He who knows not to love his own language, is worse than beasts and putrid fish") is widely quoted in order to justify pressuring Philippine citizens into using Tagalog; this ironically includes its majority of nonnative speakers. It is encountered most frequently during the Buwan ng Wika ('Language Month'), a commemoration of the establishment of the Filipino language as the national language of the Philippines.

Publication history
No manuscript for "Sa Aking Mga Kabatà" written in Rizal's handwriting exists. The poem was first published in 1906, a decade after his death, in a book authored by the poet Hermenegildo Cruz. Cruz claimed that he received the poem from another poet, Gabriel Beato Francisco, who in turn received it in 1884 from an alleged close friend of Rizal, Saturnino Raselis. José Rizal, however, never mentioned anyone by the name of Saturnino Raselis.Hermenegildo Cruz (1906) (in Tagalog) Kun Sino ang Kumathâ ng “Florante”, Kasaysayan Ng Búhay Ni Francisco Baltazar at Pag-uulat Nang Kanyang Karununga’t Kadakilaan. p. 188 Ang tulang itó ay utang ko sa kaibigan kong si G. Gabriel Beato Francisco. Ito’y ipinagkaloob sa kanyá ni G. Saturnino Raselis, táong tunay sa Lukbán, na naging gurò (maestro) sa Mahayhay ng taóng 1884. Ang ginoóng itó ay isang matalik na kaibigan ni Rizal na siyang nagkaloob sa kanyá (sa gurò) ng isang salin nitong tulâ, tandâ, dî umanó, ng kanilang pagka-katoto. The poem may have actually been written by Cruz or Francisco.

Pascual H. Poblete published a different account in his introduction to the 1909 translation Noli Me Tangere; Novelang Wicang Castila Na Tinagalog Ni Pascual H. Poblete (note old Tagalog spelling), he claims that the poem was well-known to Filipino poets during Rizal's childhood. This account was later repeated in Austin Coates' 1968 biography of Rizal, Rizal: Philippine Nationalist and Martyr, who further added that Juan Luna had a role in preserving the poem. This is not substantiated by any known evidence.

The earliest known poems of Rizal in the National Historical Institute’s collection, Poesías Por José Rizal, also date six years after the alleged writing date of "Sa Aking Mga Kabatà". His own account of the earliest awakening of his nationalistic views, identifies it as the year 1872 – the year of the executions of the priests Mariano Gómez, José Apolonio Burgos, and Jacinto Zamora. The poem is never mentioned by Rizal himself in all of his writings, despite its apparent significance in terms of his future ideals.

Authenticity
Historian Ambeth Ocampo, National Artist of the Philippines and writer Virgilio S. Almario and others have debunked Rizal's traditional authorship of the poem based on the following:

The poem uses the Tagalog word kalayaan (liberty/freedom). However, Rizal first encountered the word at least by 1882, when he was 25 years old – 17 years after he supposedly wrote the poem. Rizal first came across kalayaan (or as it was spelled during the Spanish period, kalayahan), through a Tagalog translation by Marcelo H. del Pilar of Rizal's own essay El Amor Patrio.

The fluency and sophistication of the Tagalog used in the poem also do not match Rizal's grasp of the language. Although Rizal's native tongue was Tagalog, his early education was all in Spanish. In the oft-quoted anecdote of the moth and the flame from Rizal's memoir, the children's book he and his mother were reading was entitled El Amigo de los Niños, and it was in Spanish. He would later lament his difficulties in expressing himself in Tagalog. In 1886, Rizal was in Leipzig working on a Tagalog translation of Friedrich Schiller's William Tell, which he sent home to his brother Paciano. In the accompanying letter, Rizal speaks of his difficulty finding an appropriate Tagalog equivalent of Freiheit (freedom), settling on kalayahan. Rizal cited Del Pilar's translation of his own essay as his source for kalayahan.José Rizal to Paciano Rizal (October 12, 1886; 40-11 Albertstrasse, Leipzig). I lacked many words, for example, for the word Freiheit or liberty. The Tagalog word kaligtasan cannot be used, because this means that formerly he was in some prison, slavery, etc. I found in the translation of Amor Patrio the noun malayá, kalayahan that Marcelo del Pilar uses. In the only Tagalog book I have — Florante — I don't find an equivalent noun. Rizal also attempted to write Makamisa (the intended sequel to El filibusterismo)  in Tagalog, only to give up after only ten pages and start again in Spanish.

The 8-year old Rizal's apparent familiarity with Latin and English is also questionable. In his memoir as a student in Manila, a year after the poem's supposed writing date, he admitted only having 'a little' knowledge of Latin from lessons by a friend of his father. Rizal also did not study English until 1880, more than ten years after the poem was allegedly written. English was not a prominent language in the Philippines in 1869 and its presence in the poem is believed to betray later authorship during the American Commonwealth of the Philippines.

The poem also makes use of the letters 'K' and 'W', whereas during Rizal's childhood, Tagalog spelling was based on Spanish orthography where neither letters were used. The letters 'C' and 'U' were used instead (i.e., the poem would have been spelled "Sa Aquing Mañga Cabata"). The shift in Tagalog and later Filipino orthography from 'C' to 'K' and 'U' to 'W' were proposed by Rizal himself as an adult, and was later made official in the early 20th century by the Philippine government as per grammarian Lope K. Santos's proposal.

Translation

See alsoA la juventud filipina (Tagalog: Sa Kabataang Pilipino''), a Spanish poem by Rizal with a similar title but with a very different view towards Spain
Code of Kalantiaw, another widely taught hoax perpetuated through the Philippine education system
Kundiman, a genre of traditional Filipino love songs

References

External links
Rizal's works and writings
Poems written by Dr. José Rizal
Sa Aking Mga Kabatà
Rizal's biography

19th-century hoaxes
19th century in the Philippines
Disputed Philippine historical documents
Linguistic discrimination
Hoaxes in the Philippines
José Rizal